NGC 1535 is a planetary nebula in the constellation of Eridanus, discovered by William Herschel on February 1, 1785. It is very similar to the Eskimo Nebula in both color and structure but the central star can be quite difficult to observe visually.

At the center of NGC 1535, there is an O-type star with a spectral type of O(H)5.

References

External links
 
 
 

Planetary nebulae
Eridanus (constellation)
1535